Cai-Göran Alexander Stubb (born 1 April 1968) is a Finnish politician who served as Prime Minister of Finland from 2014 to 2015. He rose to politics as a researcher specialized in the affairs of the European Union and was elected to the European Parliament in 2004 as a member of the National Coalition Party. In 2008, Stubb was appointed as Minister for Foreign Affairs following a scandal surrounding his predecessor, Ilkka Kanerva. In 2011 Stubb stood for election to the Finnish Parliament for the first time and was elected MP with the second highest vote count in the election, which led to Stubb becoming the Minister for Europe and Foreign Trade in Jyrki Katainen's cabinet.

When Katainen stepped down as Prime Minister and Chairman of the National Coalition Party in 2014, Stubb was elected as party chairman. He went on to form a five party government coalition, and was officially appointed Prime Minister by President Sauli Niinistö on 24 June. In the election held in April 2015, Stubb's National Coalition Party lost its status as the largest party, coming in as second in vote share and third in seats. After coalition negotiations between the winning Center Party, Finns Party and National Coalition Party, Stubb was appointed Minister of Finance on 29 May 2015 by newly elected Prime Minister Juha Sipilä.

In 2016, Stubb's leadership was challenged from within the party by MP Elina Lepomäki and Minister of Interior Petteri Orpo. On 11 June Stubb lost the leadership election against Orpo in the party conference. After declining ministerial positions, Stubb went on to continue as a Member of Parliament. In June 2017, he was chosen as the Vice-President of the European Investment Bank, after the previous representative from Finland Jan Vapaavuori had vacated the seat.

In October 2018, Stubb announced his candidacy for the EPP nomination for President of the European Commission in the 2019 European Parliament election, but ultimately lost in an election against Manfred Weber.

After Stubb's term at the European Investment Bank ended in January 2020, he was chosen as the Director and Professor of the School of Transnational Governance at the European University Institute.

Background

Bilingual childhood
Stubb was born in Helsinki into a bilingual family; his father was a native Swedish speaker and his mother a native Finnish speaker. Stubb spoke both languages at home. His father Göran Stubb works in the business of professional ice hockey; he was the CEO of the Finnish Ice Hockey Association from 1976 to 1983 and is currently the NHL Director of Euro Scouting.

Education
In 1986 Stubb graduated from Mainland High School in Daytona Beach, Florida and, two years later, graduated from the Gymnasiet Lärkan in Helsinki, then completed his military service.

Stubb won a golf scholarship to Furman University in South Carolina, United States. He was a member of the Finnish national golf team and intended to become a professional golfer after graduation, but studying with Brent Nelsen and others caused him to quit the sport after a year to focus on his studies. Stubb graduated with a BA degree in political science from Furman University in 1993. The following year he studied French and obtained a Diploma in French Language and Civilisation from the Sorbonne University, Paris, in 1994. Stubb speaks five languages: Swedish, Finnish, English, French and German.

In 1995, Stubb graduated with an MA degree in political science (european affairs) from the College of Europe, Belgium. He then performed his doctoral studies at the London School of Economics and Political Science, under the supervision of William Wallace, Baron Wallace of Saltaire, and obtained his PhD degree in international politics in June 1999. Wallace later said: "LSE has had a number of extremely bright Finnish students in recent years – but Alex was one of the most outstanding." Stubb's thesis was called Flexible Integration and the Amsterdam Treaty: negotiating differentiation in the 1996–97 IGC (the 1996–97 Intergovernmental Conference of the European Union).

Early career
Between 1995 and 1997, Stubb was a researcher at the Finnish Foreign Office, and then at the Academy of Finland from 1997 to 1999. In 1997 he began to work also as a columnist.

From 1999 to 2001, Stubb was a researcher in Finland's representation in the European Union in Brussels, and a member of the Finnish government's delegation to the intergovernmental negotiations for the Treaty of Nice. In 2000, he became a lecturer at the College of Europe. Following the IGC's conclusion in 2001 he became an adviser to the President of the European Commission (then Romano Prodi) and a member of the Commission Task Force on the European Convention. In 2003 he returned to Finland's representation to the EU as a special expert and to the intergovernmental negotiations, this time for the European Constitution. When that ended in 2004, he stood for the National Coalition Party in the election to the European Parliament.

Wife and children
Stubb lived in Genval, Belgium, with his wife, Suzanne Innes-Stubb, who is a British lawyer, until they moved to Tapiola, Espoo. She works for the media group Sanoma. They have two children, a daughter and son.

Sports enthusiast
A "confessed sports nut", Stubb regularly competes in marathons and triathlons and has finished Ironman Triathlons.
In his 2012 Frankfurt Ironman, he competed with "Iron Birds Finland", a team of 18 people competing to support leukemia research.
In Ironman Sweden (in Kalmar) in 2013, Stubb's time was 9:55'47. Stubb ran his best  marathon time, 3:11:24, in the 2014 Berlin Marathon.

European Parliament (2004–2008)
Stubb served as an MEP for Finland from 2004 to 2008. He was elected in 2004 with 115,225 votes (the second highest number of votes in Finland for that election) as a member of the National Coalition Party. As that party was a member of the EPP, he sat in the European People's Party-European Democrats group. During this time he became one of the most well-known members of the Parliament.

Stubb was a member of the Committee on Budgetary Control and a vice-president of the Committee on Internal Market and Consumer Protection. He was a substitute member of the Committee on Constitutional Affairs and the Delegation to the EU-Turkey Joint Parliamentary Committee (as of August 2007).

In 2006 he wrote a report for the Parliament on the EU's interpretation costs, which was adopted by the Parliament. He called for greater awareness of the costs of translation, which he calculated as 511 million euros in 2005 for the Parliament, Commission and Council together. Despite the costs and the need for some changes, he underlined that multilingualism is one of the EU's main assets.

Stubb was Vice-President of European Parliament Intergroup on LGBT Rights.

Minister for Foreign Affairs (2008–2011)

On 1 April 2008, Stubb's 40th birthday, the Finnish government announced that Stubb would be appointed as its new Minister for Foreign Affairs following a scandal surrounding his predecessor, Ilkka Kanerva. Stubb was sworn in on 4 April. The decision to appoint him was unanimous and his seat in the European Parliament was taken up by Sirpa Pietikäinen, a former environment minister.

On his appointment, Stubb was described as a competent politician and a supporter of Finland's accession to NATO, stating that he does not understand Finland's non-alignment policy.

In July 2010, Stubb invited the head of Al-Jazeera Wadah Khanfar and former President Martti Ahtisaari to discuss about the role of media in conflict resolution.
In October 2010, Stubb visited the Middle East and discussed the Middle Eastern conflict with U.S. Secretary of State Hillary Clinton.

In 2010 Stubb and Sweden's Minister for Foreign Affairs Carl Bildt proposed the European Institute of Peace. They developed a joint non-paper that was addressed to EU High Representative Catherine Ashton. They referred to the limits of traditional diplomacy and emphasised the added value that capacities beyond those available to high-level decision-makers could have. At the same time, the idea of a European Institute of Peace gained increasing attention among members of the European Parliament (MEP) and was particularly supported by German MEP Franziska Brantner and French MEP Alain Lamassoure. The institute was founded in 2014.

In 2011 when Stubb was Foreign Minister, leaked diplomatic cables from the US embassy in Helsinki released by Wikileaks stated that Jori Arvonen, Senior Political Adviser to Foreign Minister Alexander Stubb, had predicted that the National Coalition Party would aspire to lead Finland to NATO during the next parliamentary term.

Stubb brought attention to issues of disabled people. In 2010 Stubb and Finnish sign language rapper Signmark - who had become the first deaf person to sign a recording contract with an international record company - worked together to organize Silent Shout event to support sign language speakers. Stubb and Signmark also later collaborated for bringing attention to disabled people in international forums.

Stubb does not believe the President of Finland needs to attend meetings of the European Council in addition to the Prime Minister. Jyrki Katainen, the Finnish Finance Minister and chairman of National Coalition Party, supported Stubb stating he was surprising, courageous and that he "puts a smile on one's face".

As the Foreign Minister of Finland, Stubb was the Chairman-in-Office of the Organization for Security and Co-operation in Europe from 5 April 2008 to 31 December 2008. The Russo-Georgian War occurred during this period, and OSCE brokered an agreement to send military observers to the area.

In January 2011 Stubb and EU Foreign Commissioner Catherine Ashton worked together to help hundreds of beaten and imprisoned opposition activists in Belarus.

During the 2011 Egyptian revolution, Stubb expressed hope that power in Egypt will be transferred to a democratically elected government as fast as possible and without violence.

Minister for European Affairs and Foreign Trade (2011–2014)

In 2011 Stubb stood for election to the Finnish Parliament for the first time and was elected MP. He was the second-most-popular candidate in the election, in which the National Coalition Party became the largest party. In the government negotiations the Foreign Affairs ministerial portfolio went to the Social Democrats. Stubb became Minister for Europe and Foreign Trade in Jyrki Katainen's cabinet.

During Euromaidan, Stubb argued that money should be used as a force for good in geo-political relations, stating: "As I have said before, money is the best peace mediator“  and “Money should be given the Nobel Peace Prize”. (As Prime Minister he would later change his stance after further escalation in Eastern Ukraine, describing EU's sanctions against Russia necessary.)
Stubb stated that the sanctions against Russia won't be removed until Russia has met the requirements set by the EU.

Prime Minister (2014–2015)

When Jyrki Katainen stepped down as Prime Minister and Chairman of the National Coalition Party, Stubb was elected as party chairman in June 2014 over his two rivals, Paula Risikko and Jan Vapaavuori. He formed a five party government coalition, and was officially appointed Prime Minister by President Sauli Niinistö on 24 June. One of the challenges the new Prime Minister faced is the relationship between Finland and neighboring Russia. This has always been a difficult issue for Finland, as it affects Finland's willingness to become a NATO member. The recent crisis in Ukraine as well as the dispute over free trade between Russia and Finland has made the issue thornier.

Stubb supported the proposal to implement basic income experiments in the country.

In November 2014, Stubb organized Northern Future Forum, a meeting of Prime Ministers of Northern Europe, in Startup Sauna in Aalto University campus.

In March 2015, Stubb invited companies and officials to an event to discuss industrial Internet and Internet of Things.

In the election held in April 2015 Stubb's National Coalition Party lost its status as the largest party, coming in as second in vote share and third in seats. Coalition negotiations began on 8 May between the winning Center Party, Finns Party and National Coalition Party. He resigned from the office days after the election and left office on 29 May 2015.

Minister of Finance (2015–2016) 

Stubb was appointed Minister of Finance on 29 May 2015 by newly elected Prime Minister Juha Sipilä. Stubb has demanded "structural reforms, structural reforms and more structural reforms". In November 2015, Stubb said at the Finnish Parliament that about 90 percent of the Finnish authoritatives supported introduction of administrative registration. However, it was revealed that in reality only about 10 percent of them supported it.

Stubb's term as Minister of Finance drew criticism due to his perceived insensitivity towards the effects of the spending cuts he introduced, which affected the Finnish welfare state and public education system. An instance of Stubb and Sipilä bumping fists after the end of a conference that announced a deal between Finnish trade unions and the Confederation of Finnish Industries was interpreted as a sign of mockery towards the trade  unions.

In November and December 2015, Stubb was in the middle of a scandal when he was accused of lying to Finnish Parliament consistently and deliberately. In November, Stubb had said to Parliament that 90 percent of the experts who had given a statement were supporting the government's pact to make it possible for Finns to own publicly listed companies' stock through nominee accounts. The real number was 10 percent, opposite of what Stubb had said. Chancellor of Justice Jaakko Jonkka received multiple complaints over Stubb. In his reply, Jonkka stated that Stubb's mistake in numbers wasn't deliberate, but was rather an unfortunate, whilst understandable, result of a fast-paced discussion over a policy draft.

Partly as a result of a series of Stubb's gaffes, such as insensitive tweets, in spring 2016, MP Elina Lepomäki and Minister of Interior Petteri Orpo announced that they would challenge Stubb in June's party conference. On 11 June Stubb lost the election against Orpo, who became the new leader of the National Coalition Party. Orpo soon announced that he would take Stubb's seat as the Minister of Finance. In return, he offered Stubb the role of Minister for European Affairs and Foreign Trade, but Stubb declined and decided to continue as a Member of Parliament.

After Finnish politics 
On 15 June 2017, Stubb was chosen as the Vice-President of the European Investment Bank, after the previous representative from Finland Jan Vapaavuori had vacated the seat. He left his duties in the Parliament on 30 July 2017 in order to assume his new position. Stubb later commented that he had no interest in returning to the Finnish politics, but could be interested in running for the presidency of the European Commission or European Council.

In June 2017, Stubb was nominated by Martti Ahtisaari to assume the leadership of the Crisis Management Initiative, a non-governmental organisation that works to prevent and resolve conflicts. His position was confirmed by the board on 29 November 2017.

On 2 October 2018, Stubb launched his bid for presidency of the European Commission as the lead candidate of the European People's Party. On 8 November 2018, Stubb lost in EPP's Spitzenkandidat election against Manfred Weber, the group leader for the European People's Party in the European Parliament.

In January 2020, as Stubb's term at the European Investment Bank was ending, he was chosen as the Director and Professor of the School of Transnational Governance-based within the European University Institute in Florence, Italy. He started in the position on 1 May 2020.

Political views
Stubb is a proponent of deepening European integration. When he was the Minister for Foreign Affairs in 2008, Stubb gave a speech in which he argued in favour of the EU taking an active role in international politics. He noted that while the EU is the world's largest economy, it is not a superpower but a regional soft power. When running for party leadership in 2014, he described himself as an "academic federalist", although "in practice a functionalist" with regard to the EU. Stubb, for example, opposes eurobonds. He also insisted that he is no longer the "pure federalist" that he used to be when he was a researcher. Stubb has expressed his support for Turkey's EU membership in 2010. He warned that Brexit could pose a "Lehman Brothers moment" that could lead to the collapse of the EU. Stubb believes Finland should apply for membership of NATO.

Stubb is seen as a representative of the National Coalition Party's liberal wing. He has characterized himself as a "liberal" and "moderate liberal". Stubb wants to bring about a "more positive way of doing politics". He believes everyone should be appreciated and respected even when there are disagreements. He supports same-sex marriage and has been the patron of Helsinki's Pride parade. He supports multiculturalism and believes that increasing immigration is necessary. Stubb believes that the most important political divide in modern politics is that between the supporters (like himself) and opponents of globalisation.

Other work
An active columnist, Stubb has stated that he has "always been of the opinion that matters must be discussed openly and honestly". Since his professorship at the College of Europe, Stubb has published 16 books, dozens of academic articles, and hundreds of columns. In 2016, Stubb started to write columns for the Financial Times.

Stubb maintains a blog. He is also one of the most active Twitter users among European leaders. He has co-authored an e-book in Finnish about what to do on Twitter.

Stubb regularly contributes to the STG channel on YouTube (EUI School of Transnational Governance).

His book Alaston totuus ja muita kirjoituksia suomalaisista ja eurooppalaisista – The Naked Truth and Other Stories About Finns and Europeans, a collection of his columns for the Finnair in-flight magazine Blue Wings, was published in a bilingual Finnish–English edition by WSOY in 2009.

Stubb has received the Schwarzkopf Foundation prize.

Electoral history

European Parliament elections

Finland Parliamentary elections

Cabinets
 Stubb Cabinet

References

External links 

 
 Ministry of Foreign Affairs: Minister for Foreign Affairs, Alexander Stubb
 
 

|-

|-

|-

|-

|-

|-

1968 births
Living people
Politicians from Helsinki
Swedish-speaking Finns
National Coalition Party politicians
Prime Ministers of Finland
Ministers for Foreign Affairs of Finland
Ministers of Finance of Finland
Members of the Parliament of Finland (2011–15)
Members of the Parliament of Finland (2015–19)
National Coalition Party MEPs
MEPs for Finland 2004–2009
Alumni of the London School of Economics
College of Europe alumni
Academic staff of the College of Europe
Furman University alumni
Paris-Sorbonne University alumni
Recipients of the Order of the Cross of Terra Mariana, 1st Class